Hyposmocoma sideroxyloni is a species of moth of the family Cosmopterigidae. It was first described by Otto Herman Swezey in 1932. It is endemic to the Hawaiian island of Oahu.

External links

sideroxyloni
Endemic moths of Hawaii
Moths described in 1932